Southwest Junior College Conference (SJCC) is hosted by the National Junior College Athletic Association (NJCAA), also known as Region XIV (or Region 14) is a junior college conference for many Tech and Community Colleges. Conference championships are held in most sports and individuals can be named to All-Conference and All-Academic teams.

Member schools

Current members
The SWJCC currently has 19 full members, all but one are public schools:

Notes

Associate members
The SWJCC currently has three associate members, all are public schools:

See also
 National Junior College Athletic Association (NJCAA)

External links
 NJCAA Region 14 Website
 NJCAA Website

NJCAA conferences
College sports in Texas